Cyperus perangustus is a species of sedge that is native to north eastern parts of Australia.

See also 
 List of Cyperus species

References 

perangustus
Plants described in 1940
Flora of Queensland
Taxa named by Stanley Thatcher Blake